Lydia Artymiw is native of Philadelphia, Pennsylvania and an American concert pianist and Emerita Distinguished McKnight Professor of Piano in the College of Liberal Arts at the University of Minnesota.

Formative years
Artymiw was born in Philadelphia to Ukrainian parents and began piano studies at age four with George Oransky at the Ukrainian Music Institute. Her principal teachers were Freda Pastor Berkowitz, who also taught for over fifty years at the Curtis Institute of Music in Philadelphia, from 1962–1967 and Gary Graffman, her primary mentor, with whom she studied from 1967 to 1979. Artymiw graduated summa cum laude from the University of the Arts in Philadelphia in 1973, which honored her with a "Distinguished Alumna" award in 1991.

Career
Artymiw has appeared as soloist with over 100 orchestras world-wide, including the Boston Symphony Orchestra, Cleveland Orchestra, Philadelphia Orchestra, New York Philharmonic, Minnesota Orchestra, the Los Angeles Philharmonic Orchestra at the Hollywood Bowl, and the American, Baltimore, Buffalo, Cincinnati, Detroit, Pittsburgh, St. Louis, San Francisco, Kansas City, National, Seattle, and Florida Symphonies, the St. Paul and St. Luke's Chamber Orchestras.  She has performed at over 50 festivals including Marlboro, Mostly Mozart, Aspen, Caramoor, South Mountain, Chautauqua, Hollywood Bowl, Newport, Maverick, Music Mountain, Seattle, Bellingham, Bay Chamber, Chamber Music Northwest, Eastern Shore Maryland, Grand Canyon, Bravo!Vail, Ouray, Tucson, Bantry, Round Top, Meadowmount, Montréal, Virginia Waterfront, Hampden-Sydney, and St. Barts. She has appeared in chamber performances with the Alexander, American, Borromeo, Concord, Daedalus, Guarneri, Miami, Orion, and Tokyo Quartets as well as in duo recitals with Arnold Steinhardt, Michael Tree, Kim Kashkashian, Marcy Rosen, Pina Carmirelli, Benita Valente, John Aler, and Yo-Yo Ma.  She was a member of the Steinhardt-Artymiw-Eskin Trio with Arnold Steinhardt and Jules Eskin for ten years. She has also performed solo recitals in most major American cities including New York, Philadelphia, Boston, Chicago, Washington, Los Angeles, Seattle, Portland (OR), Miami, Houston, Austin, Minneapolis, Detroit, and Pittsburgh, as well as in Canada, England, Scotland, Ireland, Finland, Switzerland, Germany, Italy, France, Estonia, Ukraine, China, Taiwan, Korea, Philippines, Singapore, and New Zealand.

Artymiw has been successful on the international competition circuit.  She won third prize in the 1978 Leeds competition (UK) and was a finalist in the 1976 Leventritt competition (USA), a year in which no first prize was given. She was also a recipient of the Avery Fisher Career Grant in 1987 and the Andrew Wolf Chamber Music Award in 1989.
Artymiw has served as a competition juror for the 2022 Charles Wadsworth Piano Competition in Georgia, the 2019 First China International Competition (Beijing), the 2017 Lang Lang Futian International Piano Competition, the 2015 First Van Cliburn Junior International Piano Competition and Festival, and for the William Kapell, Esther Honens, Wisconsin PianoArts, Pro Musicis, and the New York International Piano Competitions. She has also been on the juries for seventeen piano concerto competitions at Juilliard and the Manhattan School, as well as Juilliard's Bachauer and Nordmann Fellowship Competitions. 
Lydia Artymiw is Emerita Distinguished McKnight Professor of Piano at the University of Minnesota where she was on the faculty from 1989-2020. In 2000, she received the Dean's Medal at the College of Liberal Arts at the University of Minnesota. In 2015, Artymiw was awarded the 2015 Outstanding Contributions to Postbaccalaureate, Graduate, and Professional Education Prize by the Board of Regents. Since 2015, Artymiw has been a guest piano faculty member at Juilliard. She presented piano master classes at both Juilliard and Curtis in 2016 as well as for the Manhattan School in 2021.

She has recorded for Chandos, Centaur, Pantheon, Artegra, and Bridge. Her recordings have received awards from Gramophone (Best of the Year) and Ovation (Best of the Month), and she was nominated for a 2019 Grammy Award with cellist Marcy Rosen for their Bridge CD of "The Complete Cello/Piano Works of Felix Mendelssohn." Her Chandos CD of Tchaikovsky's "The Seasons" sold over 20,000 copies and is still in print.

References

External links
 Lydia Artymiw (official website)
 Genealogy on Pianists Corner

Year of birth missing (living people)
Living people
Musicians from Philadelphia
American people of Ukrainian descent
American classical pianists
American women classical pianists
Prize-winners of the Leeds International Pianoforte Competition
University of the Arts (Philadelphia) alumni
University of Minnesota faculty
Classical musicians from Pennsylvania
21st-century classical pianists
21st-century American women pianists
21st-century American pianists
American women academics